Degnand Wilfried Gnonto (born 5 November 2003) is an Italian professional footballer who plays as a forward for Premier League club Leeds United and the Italy national team.

Early life
Gnonto was born in Verbania, Italy, in 2003 to Ivorian parents and he grew up in Baveno, where he attended a liceo classico before switching to pursue secondary education at a liceo scientifico.

Club career

FC Zürich
A youth product of Inter Milan since the age of nine, Gnonto joined Swiss club Zürich on 23 April 2020. Gnonto made his professional debut with Zürich as a substitute in a 4–1 away Swiss Super League win over FC Vaduz on 24 October 2020, and assisted his team's final goal. He scored his first professional goal on 21 May 2021, once again in a 4–1 league home win over FC Vaduz, after replacing Antonio Marchesano in the second half.

In his second season, he won the 2021–22 Swiss Super League title with the club, with four games remaining.

Leeds United
On 2 September 2022, Gnonto joined Leeds United on a five-year deal for an undisclosed fee. He made his Premier League debut on 29 October, in Leeds’ 2–1 win against Liverpool at Anfield, coming on as a 72nd-minute substitute for Jack Harrison and opening the action that led to the winning goal by Crysencio Summerville. On 5 November, he again replaced Harrison in the second half of the league match against Bournemouth, eventually assisting Summerville for his second consecutive winning goal.

On 4 January 2023, Gnonto scored his first Premier League goal for Leeds, a 28th minute opener in a 2–2 home draw against West Ham United. Two weeks later he scored a brace for Leeds in an FA Cup third round replay against Cardiff City at Elland Road, a volley within the first minute and a goal scored in the 36th minute in a 5–2 win.

On 8 February 2023, he scored less than a minute into Leeds' 2–2 draw with Manchester United, following a pass from Patrick Bamford. in doing so he became the youngest overseas player to score at Old Trafford in a Premier League fixture.

International career
Gnonto is of Ivorian descent. He is a youth international for Italy, having taken part with the Italy U17 in the 2019 FIFA U-17 World Cup.

In May 2022, after being called by Roberto Mancini to join a training camp for the Italy national team, Gnonto was included in the final 30-player Azzurri squad for the 2022 Finalissima. On 4 June 2022, Gnonto made his senior debut for Italy in a UEFA Nations League game against Germany, coming on as a substitute and providing an assist in a 1–1 home draw. On 14 June, in Italy's fourth group match, he scored his first international goal in a 5–2 away loss to Germany, to become the youngest goalscorer for Italy, aged 18 years and 222 days, breaking the previous record held by Bruno Nicolè since 1958.

Career statistics

Club

International 

Italy score listed first, score column indicates score after each Gnonto goal.

Honours 
Zürich
 Swiss Super League: 2021–22

References

External links
 
 Wilfried Gnonto at dbFCZ
 
 
 
 Wilfried Gnonto Swiss Football League profile

2003 births
Living people
Italian people of Ivorian descent
Italian sportspeople of African descent
People from Verbania
Sportspeople from the Province of Verbano-Cusio-Ossola
Footballers from Piedmont
Italian footballers
Association football forwards
Inter Milan players
FC Zürich players
Leeds United F.C. players
Swiss Super League players
Premier League players
Italian expatriate footballers
Italian expatriate sportspeople in Switzerland
Italian expatriate sportspeople in England
Expatriate footballers in Switzerland
Expatriate footballers in England
Italy youth international footballers
Italy international footballers